Somghan Rural District is a rural district (dehestan) in Kuhchenar County, Fars Province, Iran. At the 2006 census, its population was 8,171, in 1,719 families.  The rural district has 12 villages.

References 

Rural Districts of Fars Province
Kazerun County